Kahnaviyeh-ye Olya va Sofla (also Romanized as Kahnavīyeh-ye ‘Olyā va Soflá; also known as Kahnavīyeh and Kahnū’īyeh) is a village in Kuhestan Rural District, in the Central District of Nain County, Isfahan Province, Iran. At the 2006 census, its population was 10, in 4 families.

References 

Populated places in Nain County